Antispila isabella is a species of moth of the family Heliozelidae. It is found in Ontario, Connecticut, Georgia, Kentucky, New York, Pennsylvania and Vermont. However, research concludes that a complex of species is involved under this name.

The larvae feed on Vitis aestivalis, Vitis labrusca and Vitis riparia. They mine the leaves of their host plant. The mines are relatively large. No gallery is visible and the mine has the form of a large blotch, with a roundish patch of reddish frass near the beginning, probably attached to the upper epidermis, and dispersed black frass throughout the mine.

References

Moths described in 1860
Heliozelidae